The 1825 Connecticut gubernatorial election was held on April 14, 1825. Incumbent governor and Toleration Party candidate Oliver Wolcott Jr. defeated Federalist Party candidates former senator David Daggett, former delegate Nathan Smith and former congressman Timothy Pitkin, winning with 68.82% of the vote.

General election

Candidates
Major candidates

Oliver Wolcott Jr., Toleration
David Daggett, Federalist
Nathan Smith, Federalist
Timothy Pitkin, Federalist

Minor candidates

David Plant, Jacksonian

Results

References

1825
Connecticut
Gubernatorial